Nakawa may refer to:

 Nakawa, an area in the city of Kampala, Uganda's capital
 Nakawa Division, one of the divisions that makes up the city of Kampala, Uganda
 Israel Al-Nakawa, better known as Israel Alnaqua (?-1391), an ethical writer and martyr who lived in Toledo, Spain
 Shōsuke Nakawa (b. 1931), a Japanese playwright and theater director
 Nakawa (moth) - a genus of moth in the family of Thyrididae
 Nakawa, a lion that had been in Liuwa Plain National Park, Zambia